Giovanni Bernardi (1494 – 22 May 1553), also known as Giovanni da Castel Bolognese and as Giovanni da Castelbolognese, was an Italian gem engraver and medallist who was born in Castel Bolognese, Italy.  He was the son of a goldsmith and by 1530 had moved to Rome, where he had a position in the Papal mint, which also allowed him time to work for other patrons.  These included Cardinal Ippolito de' Medici (1511–35), Pope Clement VII (1523–34), Cardinal Alessandro Farnese, the future Pope Paul III, as well as his grandson, also called Cardinal Alessandro Farnese. He was "a skillful composer of elegant nudes in elaborate scenes".

Bernardi was best known for his intaglios engraved in rock crystal, which had been pioneered by Valerio Belli.  This was a difficult luxury artform that was fashionable among wealthy Italian collectors. Though described as being "engraved", the intaglios are cut by drills, sometimes quite deeply.  Castings of many of the crystal carvings were taken in wax and them used to make metal plaquettes, which Bernardi also designed and made de novo.  He also made some versions in glass.

He died in Faenza, Italy in 1553.

Notes

References 
 Krasnowa, Natalie, Rock-Crystals by Giovanni Bernardi in the Hermitage Museum, The Burlington Magazine for Connoisseurs, Vol. 56, No. 322 (Jan., 1930), 36-38.
 Thornton, D., Valerio Belli and after: Renaissance gems in the British Museum, Jewellery Studies-3, 1998, 11-20.
 Vasari, Giorgio, Le Vite delle più eccellenti pittori, scultori, ed architettori, many editions and translations.
 Wilson, Carolyn C., Renaissance Small Bronze Sculpture and Associated Decorative Arts, 1983, National Gallery of Art (Washington),

External links

 Giovanni Bernardi in ArtCyclopedia
European sculpture and metalwork, a collection catalog from The Metropolitan Museum of Art Libraries (fully available online as PDF), which contains material on Bernardi (see index)

16th-century Italian sculptors
Italian male sculptors
Italian medallists
Engraved gem artists
1494 births
1553 deaths
16th-century medallists